February 19 - Eastern Orthodox liturgical calendar - February 21

All fixed commemorations below are observed on March 5 (March 4 on leap years) by Eastern Orthodox Churches on the Old Calendar.

For February 20th, Orthodox Churches on the Old Calendar commemorate the Saints listed on February 7.

Saints

 Hieromartyr Eleutherius of Byzantium, Bishop in Byzantium (136)
 Martyrs Didymos, Nemesios and Potamios, in Cyprus.
 Saint Eutropius, martyr (308)
 Hieromartyr Sadoc of Persia (Sadoth), Bishop of Persia, and 128 Martyrs with him (330)
 Saint Anianus (Aninas).
 Venerable Bessarion the Great, Wonderworker of Egypt (466)  (see also: June 6)
 Saint Agatho of Rome, Pope of Rome (682)
 Saint Leo of Catania (Leo the Wonderworker), Bishop of Catania in Sicily (785)
 Venerable Cindeus of Pisidia (Kindeos), Bishop of Pisidia.
 Venerable Plotinus, monk.

Pre-Schism Western saints

 Saint Bolcan (Olcan), baptised by St Patrick, Bolcan later became Bishop of Derkan in Ireland (c. 480)
 Saint Valerius (Valier), first Bishop of Couserans in France (5th century?)
 Saint Falco of Maastricht, Bishop of Maastricht in the Netherlands (512)
 Saint Eleutherius of Tournai, Bishop of Tournai (531)
 Saint Mildrith, Anglo-Saxon abbess of the Abbey at Minster-in-Thanet, Kent (c. 700)  (see also: July 13)
 Saint Eucherius of Orléans, Bishop of Orleans (c. 740)
 Saint Colgan, called  'the Wise'  and  'the Chief Scribe of the Irish' , he was Abbot of Clonmacnoise in Offaly in Ireland (c. 796)

Post-Schism Orthodox saints

 Saint Yaroslav the Wise, great prince of Kyiv, son of the Varangian (Viking) Grand Prince Vladimir the Great (1054)
 Saint Agatho, Wonderworker of the Kyiv Caves Monastery (13th-14th centuries)
 Martyrdom of St. Cornelius, abbot of the Pskov-Caves Monastery, by beheading, and his disciple St. Bassian of Murom (1570)
 Venerable Martyrs 34 monks and novices of Valaam Monastery, martyred by the Lutherans (1578): 
 Hieromonk Titus, 
 Schemamonk Tikhon, 
 Monks Gelasius, Sergius, Varlaam, Sabbas, Conon, Sylvester, Cyprian, Pimen, John, Samonas, Jonah, David, Cornelius, Niphon, Athanasius, and Serapion; and novices Varlaam, Athanasius, Anthony, Luke, Leontius, Thomas, Dionysius, Philip, Ignatius, Basil, Pachomius, Basil, Theophilus, John, Theodore, and John.

New martyrs and confessors

 New Hieromartyr Nicholas Rozov, Priest (1938)

Icon gallery

Notes

References

Sources
 February 20 / March 5. Orthodox Calendar (Pravoslavie.ru).
 March 5 / February 20. Holy Trinity Russian Orthodox Church (A parish of the Patriarchate of Moscow).
 February 20. OCA - The Lives of the Saints.
 The Autonomous Orthodox Metropolia of Western Europe and the Americas. St. Hilarion Calendar of Saints for the year of our Lord 2004. St. Hilarion Press (Austin, TX). p. 16.
 The Twentieth Day of the Month of February. Orthodoxy in China.
 February 20. Latin Saints of the Orthodox Patriarchate of Rome.
 The Roman Martyrology. Transl. by the Archbishop of Baltimore. Last Edition, According to the Copy Printed at Rome in 1914. Revised Edition, with the Imprimatur of His Eminence Cardinal Gibbons. Baltimore: John Murphy Company, 1916. pp. 53-54.
 Rev. Richard Stanton. A Menology of England and Wales, or, Brief Memorials of the Ancient British and English Saints Arranged According to the Calendar, Together with the Martyrs of the 16th and 17th Centuries. London: Burns & Oates, 1892. pp. 79-80.

Greek Sources
 Great Synaxaristes:  20 Φεβρουαρίου. Μεγασ Συναξαριστησ.
  Συναξαριστής. 20 Φεβρουαρίου. Ecclesia.gr. (H Εκκλησια τησ Ελλαδοσ).

Russian Sources
  5 марта (20 февраля). Православная Энциклопедия под редакцией Патриарха Московского и всея Руси Кирилла (электронная версия). (Orthodox Encyclopedia - Pravenc.ru).
  20 февраля (ст.ст.) 5 марта 2014 (нов. ст.). Русская Православная Церковь Отдел внешних церковных связей. (Decr).

February in the Eastern Orthodox calendar